The 1930 Chicago Maroons football team was an American football team that represented the University of Chicago during the 1930 college football season. In their 39th season under head coach Amos Alonzo Stagg, the Maroons compiled a 2–5–2 record, finished in last place in the Big Ten Conference, and were outscored by their opponents by a combined total of 129 to 33.

Schedule

References

Chicago
Chicago Maroons football seasons
Chicago Maroons football